"Three Little Pigs" is a song by American comedy rock band Green Jellÿ from their first video album, Cereal Killer (1992). Released by Zoo Entertainment in 1992 with the original band name, Green Jellö, the single was re-released on May 24, 1993, under the name Green Jellÿ due to a lawsuit for trademark infringement by the owners of Jell-O.

The song peaked at number 17 on the US Billboard Hot 100 in the summer of 1993, staying on the listing for 20 weeks, and charted at number five in the United Kingdom. It additionally reached number one in New Zealand for two nonconsecutive weeks and charted highly in several European countries. The chart success can be partly attributed to the song's unique and heavily aired music video. "Three Little Pigs" was ranked number 35 on VH1's 40 Most Awesomely Bad Metal Songs...Ever.

Writing and composition
Written by Marc Levinthal and Bill Manspeaker after a "late-night drinkfest" at Zatar's in Hollywood, the song is a re-telling of the classic fairy tale Three Little Pigs, with modern twists—the straw-builder pig escaped the farm where he was raised to begin a new life in Los Angeles, the stick-builder pig is a marijuana-smoking, Bob Marley-listening, dumpster diving hippie and preacher from Venice Beach, and the third pig is the son of rock star Pig Nugent with a master's degree in architecture from Harvard College who builds his concrete mansion in Hollywood Hills. The third pig dispatches the Harley-riding Big Bad Wolf by calling in Rambo, who mows the wolf down with a machine gun.

Critical reception
James Masterton wrote in his weekly UK chart commentary, "From straight out of nowhere to land in the Top 5 comes the surprise of the week. Who would have thought a tongue in cheek grunge rap retelling the old nursery tale would cross over so dramatically. Here it is though, and may well go Top 3 next week, aided in part by the clever plasticine animated video which accompanies the track." Andy Martin from Music Week rated the song four out of five. He added, "The excellent and hilarious promo that accompanies this bastardisation of the porcine children's tale (like Creature Comforts on acid) should win TV coverage and propel the weird, wacky and wonderful Green Jelly to stardom, or at least a Top 20 hit single. Expect BMG to pull out all the stops on this one." Also Tony Cross from Smash Hits gave it four out of five, commenting, "This heavy metal (should that be mental?) version of the little pig fairy-tale is weird indeed (and sports a flippin' smart video too). Full throttle crash and trash guitars bring the story right up to date, complete with hilarious high-pitched voices for the pigs ("not by the hair of our chinny chin chin!"), and torrents of sound for the big bad wolf. A rock opera that deserves a listen."

Music video
The song's accompanying stop motion claymation music video received regular rotation on MTV, and in 1993 it was certified gold by the RIAA. "Three Little Pigs" was notable for being the first known music single to debut only in video form; when the music video was first shown on MTV, fans could buy the song on videotape, but not on CD. In 1993, however, the single was finally released in CD form. The music video was later published by Vevo on YouTube in March 2014. As of December 2022, it had generated more than 27 million views.

Track listings
 Vinyl pressing
 "Three Little Pigs"

 1993 CD pressing
"Three Little Pigs" (edit) – 2:30
"Three Little Pigs" (full-length version) – 5:54
"Obey the Cowgod" – 3:09

Personnel
 Bill Manspeaker (as Moronic Dicktator) – vocals
 Maynard James Keenan – guest voice of Three Little Pigs
 Pauly Shore – guest voice of Three Little Pigs
 Gary Helsinger (as Hotsy Menshot) – voice of Rambo
 C.J. Buscaglia (as Jesus Quisp) – guitars, producer
 Steven Shenar (as Sven Seven) – guitars
 Michael Bloomquist (as Rootin') – bass
 Joe Russo (as Mother Eucker) – bass
 Danny Carey (as Danny Longlegs) – drums

Charts

Weekly charts

Year-end charts

Certifications

Release history

References

1992 songs
1993 singles
Cultural depictions of Sylvester Stallone
Green Jellÿ songs
Number-one singles in New Zealand
Songs about pigs
Songs about wolves
Songs based on fairy tales
Stop-motion animated music videos
Works based on The Three Little Pigs
Zoo Entertainment (record label) singles